Zyryanka Airport  is the main airport serving the locality of Zyryanka, Verkhnekolymsky District in the Sakha Republic of Russia. When it cannot be used, the Zyryanka West Airport complements it.

Google Earth Images of June, 2017 show the runway covered by floodwaters, possibly destroyed.

Airlines and destinations

References

Airports built in the Soviet Union
Airports in the Sakha Republic